Haldeman is a surname of Swiss German origin, stemming from the village Halden, now part of the municipality of Bischofszell, in the canton of Thurgau, Switzerland. Other forms of the name are Haldemann, Holdeman, Holdiman, Holderman and others. The form Haldemann is still overwhelmingly found in Switzerland.

As early as 1538 and 1670/71 the name appeared in Anabaptist records in Switzerland. In 1727 three Mennonite brothers left the canton of Bern and immigrated to Montgomery County, Pennsylvania. Among Swiss and German Mennonites the name later died out. The forms of the name ending in -man are not seldom among Americans of originally Swiss German and later Pennsylvania German Mennonite origin of the paternal lineage.

Notable people with the surname include:

 Samuel Stehman Haldeman (1812–1880), U.S. naturalist and philologist
 Walter Newman Haldeman (1821–1902), U.S. newspaper publisher, businessman, Major League Baseball owner
 Jacob S. Haldeman (1823–1889), U.S. banker, politician and ambassador
 Richard Jacobs Haldeman (1831–1886), U.S. politician
 E. Haldeman-Julius (1889–1951), and Anna Marcet Haldeman (died 1941), U.S. publishers
 H. R. Haldeman (1926–1993), U.S. politician; White House Chief of Staff (1969–1973) under President Richard Nixon, convicted in Watergate scandal
 Jack C. Haldeman II (1941–2002), U.S. biologist and science fiction writer
 Joe Haldeman (born 1943), U.S. science fiction writer
 Charles E. Haldeman (born 1948), U.S. entrepreneur

See also
Haldeman, Kentucky

References

German-language surnames